Francis Momoh (born 25 March 2001) is a Nigerian professional footballer who plays as a forward for Grasshopper.

Club career 
On 8 January 2019, Momoh made the jump to Europe, where he was signed by Swiss club Grasshopper Club Zürich, who play in the top Swiss league, the Swiss Super League. 

He gave his debut for the first team on 5 October 2019 in a 3-0 victory over FC Wil, where he was subbed on in the 79th minute. 

For the 2020/21 season, he was transferred to the secondary squad, who play in the 1. Liga. He shot four goals in five games during this season. 

For the following season, he was recalled to the first squad, while still primarily playing for the reserve team. He has shot five goals in nine games for the reserve team in the current season. On 5 February 2022, he started for the main squad for the first time in a 1-3 defeat to city rivals FC Zürich. A week later, he was selected for the starting lineup again and managed to shoot his first two goals in the top Swiss league, in a 2-0 victory over Lausanne-Sport.

References

External links

2001 births
Living people
Nigerian footballers
Association football forwards
Grasshopper Club Zürich players
Swiss Super League players
Sportspeople from Kaduna